Juris Karašausks (born 18 January 1970) is a retired Latvian football striker.

His son Artūrs Karašausks is also a football striker and a member of national team.

References

1971 births
Living people
Latvian footballers
FK RFS players
Dinaburg FC players
FK Rīga players
Association football forwards
Latvia international footballers